Illinois Route 135 (IL 135) is a , L-shaped state road in Warren County, Illinois, United States, that runs from IL 164 west of Monmouth to Main Street in Alexis, at the base of the town's water tower.

Route description
IL 135 is an undivided two-lane surface road for its entire length. It runs concurrently with IL 94 for a few miles north of Little York, and with U.S. Route 67 (US 67) for a few miles west of Alexis. IL 135 is signed in all four directions and changes directions at the turnoff from IL 94.

History
SBI Route 135 originally ran from IL 1 to State Road 154 (SR 154) near Hutsonville via a bridge over the Wabash River. This was removed in 1935; the bridge is now unnumbered. In 1937 it was applied on what was IL 94B, the current routing.

Major intersections

See also

References

External links

135
Transportation in Warren County, Illinois